The following is a list of Michigan State Historic Sites in Muskegon County, Michigan. Sites marked with a dagger (†) are also listed on the National Register of Historic Places in Muskegon County, Michigan.


Current listings

See also
 National Register of Historic Places listings in Muskegon County, Michigan

Sources
 Historic Sites Online – Muskegon County. Michigan State Housing Developmental Authority. Accessed May 19, 2011.

References

Muskegon County
State Historic Sites
Tourist attractions in Muskegon County, Michigan